Pashto is an Eastern Iranian language in the Indo-European language family. It is known in historical Persian literature as Afghani.

Spoken as a native language mostly by ethnic Pashtuns, it is one of the two official languages of Afghanistan alongside Dari, and it is the second-largest provincial language of Pakistan, spoken mainly in Khyber Pakhtunkhwa and the northern districts of Balochistan. Likewise, it is the primary language of the Pashtun diaspora around the world. The total number of Pashto-speakers is at least 40 million, although some estimates place it as high as 60 million. Pashto is "one of the primary markers of ethnic identity" amongst Pashtuns.

Geographic distribution

A national language of Afghanistan, Pashto is primarily spoken in the east, south, and southwest, but also in some northern and western parts of the country. The exact number of speakers is unavailable, but different estimates show that Pashto is the mother tongue of 45–60% of the total population of Afghanistan.

In Pakistan, Pashto is spoken by % of its population, mainly in the northwestern province of Khyber Pakhtunkhwa and northern districts of Balochistan province. It is also spoken in parts of Mianwali and Attock districts of the Punjab province, areas of Gilgit-Baltistan and in Islamabad. Pashto speakers are found in other major cities of Pakistan, most notably Karachi, Sindh, which may have the largest Pashtun population of any city in the world.

Other communities of Pashto speakers are found in India, Tajikistan, and northeastern Iran (primarily in South Khorasan Province to the east of Qaen, near the Afghan border). In India most ethnic Pashtun (Pathan) peoples speak the geographically native Hindi-Urdu language rather than Pashto, but there are small numbers of Pashto speakers, such as the Sheen Khalai in Rajasthan, and the Pathan community in the city of Kolkata, often nicknamed the Kabuliwala ("people of Kabul"). Pashtun diaspora communities in other countries around the world speak Pashto, especially the sizable communities in the United Arab Emirates and Saudi Arabia.

Afghanistan
Pashto is one of the two official languages of Afghanistan, along with Dari Persian. Since the early 18th century, the monarchs of Afghanistan have been ethnic Pashtuns (except for Habibullāh Kalakāni in 1929). Persian, the literary language of the royal court, was more widely used in government institutions, while the Pashtun tribes spoke Pashto as their native tongue. King Amanullah Khan began promoting Pashto during his reign (1926–1929) as a marker of ethnic identity and as a symbol of "official nationalism" leading Afghanistan to independence after the defeat of the British Empire in the Third Anglo-Afghan War in 1919. In the 1930s a movement began to take hold to promote Pashto as a language of government, administration, and art with the establishment of a Pashto Society Pashto Anjuman in 1931 and the inauguration of the Kabul University in 1932 as well as the formation of the Pashto Academy (Pashto Tolana) in 1937. Muhammad Na'im Khan, the minister of education between 1938 and 1946, inaugurated the formal policy of promoting Pashto as Afghanistan's national language, leading to the commission and publication of Pashto textbooks. The Pashto Tolana was later incorporated into the Academy of Sciences Afghanistan in line with Soviet model following the Saur Revolution in 1978.

Although officially supporting the use of Pashto, the Afghan elite regarded Persian as a "sophisticated language and a symbol of cultured upbringing". King Zahir Shah (reigning 1933–1973) thus followed suit after his father Nadir Khan had decreed in 1933 that officials were to study and utilize both Persian and Pashto. In 1936  a royal decree of Zahir Shah formally granted Pashto the status of an official language, with full rights to use in all aspects of government and education – despite the fact that the ethnically Pashtun royal family and bureaucrats mostly spoke Persian. Thus Pashto became a national language, a symbol for Pashtun nationalism.

The constitutional assembly reaffirmed the status of Pashto as an official language in 1964 when Afghan Persian was officially renamed to Dari. The lyrics of the national anthem of Afghanistan are in Pashto.

Pakistan
In British India, prior to the creation of Pakistan by the British government, the 1920s saw the blossoming of Pashto language in the then NWFP: Abdul Ghafar Khan in 1921 established the Anjuman-e- Islah al-Afaghina (Society for the Reformation of Afghans)  to promote Pashto as an extension of Pashtun culture; around 80,000 people attended the Society's annual meeting in 1927. In 1955, Pashtun intellectuals including Abdul Qadir formed the Pashto Academy Peshawar on the model of Pashto Tolana formed in Afghanistan. In 1974, the Department of Pashto was established in the University of Balochistan for the promotion of Pashto.

In Pakistan, Pashto is the first language around of % of its population (per the 1998 census).  However, Urdu and English are the two official languages of Pakistan. Pashto has no official status at the federal level. On a provincial level, Pashto is the regional language of Khyber Pakhtunkhwa and north Balochistan. Yet, the primary medium of education in government schools in Pakistan is Urdu.

The lack of importance given to Pashto and her neglect has caused growing resentment amongst Pashtuns. It is noted that Pashto is taught poorly in schools in Pakistan. Moreover, in government schools material is not provided for in the Pashto dialect of that locality, Pashto being a dialectically rich language.  Further, researchers have observed that Pashtun students are unable to fully comprehend educational material in Urdu.

Professor Tariq Rahman states:Robert Nicols states:

Although Pashto used as a medium of instruction in schools for Pashtun students results in better understanding and comprehension for students when compared to using Urdu, still the government of Pakistan has only introduced Pashto at the primary levels in state-run schools. Taimur Khan remarks: "the dominant Urdu language squeezes and denies any space for Pashto language in the official and formal capacity. In this contact zone, Pashto language exists but in a subordinate and unofficial capacity".

History
Some linguists have argued that Pashto is descended from Avestan or a variety very similar to it, while others have attempted to place it closer to Bactrian. However, neither position is universally agreed upon. What scholars do agree on is the fact that Pashto is an Eastern Iranian language sharing characteristics with Eastern Middle Iranian languages such as Bactrian, Khwarezmian and Sogdian.

Compare with other Eastern Iranian Languages and Old Avestan:

Strabo, who lived between 64 BC and 24 CE, explains that the tribes inhabiting the lands west of the Indus River were part of Ariana. This was around the time when the area inhabited by the Pashtuns was governed by the Greco-Bactrian Kingdom. From the 3rd century CE onward, they are mostly referred to by the name Afghan (Abgan).

Abdul Hai Habibi believed that the earliest modern Pashto work dates back to Amir Kror Suri of the early Ghurid period in the 8th century, and they use the writings found in Pata Khazana.  Pə́ṭa Xazāná is a Pashto manuscript claimed to be written by Mohammad Hotak under the patronage of the Pashtun emperor Hussain Hotak in Kandahar; containing an anthology of Pashto poets. However, its authenticity is disputed by scholars such as David Neil MacKenzie and Lucia Serena Loi. Nile Green comments in this regard:

From the 16th century, Pashto poetry become very popular among the Pashtuns. Some of those who wrote in Pashto are Bayazid Pir Roshan (a major inventor of the Pashto alphabet), Khushal Khan Khattak, Rahman Baba, Nazo Tokhi, and Ahmad Shah Durrani, founder of the modern state of Afghanistan or the Durrani Empire. The Pashtun literary tradition grew in the backdrop to weakening Pashtun power following Mughal rule: Khushal Khan Khattak used Pashto poetry to rally for Pashtun unity and Pir Bayazid as an expedient means to spread his message to the Pashtun masses.

For instance Khushal Khattak laments in :

Grammar

Pashto is a subject–object–verb (SOV) language with split ergativity. In Pashto, this means that the verb agrees with the subject in transitive and intransitive sentences in non-past, non-completed clauses, but when a completed action is reported in any of the past tenses, the verb agrees with the subject if it is intransitive, but with the object if it is transitive. Verbs are inflected for present, simple past, past progressive, present perfect, and past perfect tenses. There is also an inflection for the subjunctive mood.

Nouns and adjectives are inflected for two genders (masculine and feminine), two numbers (singular and plural), and four cases (direct, oblique, ablative, and vocative). The possessor precedes the possessed in the genitive construction, and adjectives come before the nouns they modify.

Unlike most other Indo-Iranian languages, Pashto uses all three types of adpositions—prepositions, postpositions, and circumpositions.

Phonology

Vowels

Consonants

 (Phonemes) that have been borrowed, thus non-native to Pashto, are color coded and have been placed in brackets.
  is apical postalveolar .
 The approximant  is palatal, whereas  and  vary from retroflex sibilants  to non-sibilant dorso-palatal fricatives , depending on the dialect. In particular, the retroflex fricatives, which represent the original pronunciation of these sounds, are preserved in the South Western dialects (especially the prestige dialect of Kandahar), while they are pronounced as palatal fricatives in the North Western dialects. Furthermore, according to Henderson (1983), the voiced palatal fricative  actually occurs generally in the Wardak Province, and is merged into  elsewhere in the North Western dialects.
 The velars  followed by the close back rounded vowel  assimilate into the labialized velars .
 Voiceless stops  are all unaspirated, like  Romance languages, and Austronesian languages; they have slightly aspirated allophones prevocalically in a stressed syllable.

Vocabulary

In Pashto, most of the native elements of the lexicon are related to other Eastern Iranian languages. As noted by Josef Elfenbein, "Loanwords have been traced in Pashto as far back as the third century B.C., and include words from Greek and probably Old Persian". For instance, Georg Morgenstierne notes the Pashto word   i.e. a hand-mill as being derived from the Ancient Greek word  (i.e. a device). Post-7th century borrowings came primarily from Persian and Hindi-Urdu, with Arabic words being borrowed through Persian, but sometimes directly. Modern speech borrows words from English, French, and German.

However, a remarkably large number of words are unique to Pashto.

Here is an exemplary list of Pure Pashto and borrowings:

Due to the incursion of Persian and Persianized-Arabic in modern speech, linguistic purism of Pashto is advocated to prevent its  own vocabulary from dying out.

Classical vocabulary 
There is a lot of old vocabulary that has been replaced by borrowings e.g. Or the word   meaning 'uniqueness' used by Pir Roshan Bayazid. Such classical vocabulary is being reintroduced to modern Pashto. Some words also survive in dialects like  'the bride-room'.

Example from Khayr al-Bayān:

 
 Transliteration: 
 Translation: "... without singularity/uniqueness, without calmness and by bad-attitude are on sin ."

Writing system

Pashto employs the Pashto alphabet, a modified form of the Perso-Arabic alphabet or Arabic script. In the 16th century, Bayazid Pir Roshan introduced 13 new letters to the Pashto alphabet. The alphabet was further modified over the years.

The Pashto alphabet consists of 45 to 46 letters and 4 diacritic marks. Latin Pashto is also used. In Latin transliteration, stress is represented by the following markers over vowels: ә́, á, ā́, ú, ó, í and é. The following table (read from left to right) gives the letters' isolated forms, along with possible Latin equivalents and typical IPA values:

Dialects

Pashto dialects are divided into two categories, the "soft" southern grouping of Paṣ̌tō, and the "hard" northern grouping of Pax̌tō (Pakhtu). Each group is further divided into a number of dialects. The Southern dialect of Tareeno is the most distinctive Pashto dialect.1. Southern variety
Abdaili or Kandahar dialect (or South Western  dialect)
Kakar dialect (or South Eastern dialect)
Shirani dialect
Mandokhel dialect
Marwat-Bettani dialect
Southern Karlani group
Khattak dialect
Wazirwola dialect
Dawarwola dialect
Masidwola dialect
Banisi (Banu) dialect

2. Northern variety
Central Ghilji dialect (or North Western dialect)
Yusapzai and Momand dialect (or North Eastern dialect)
Northern Karlani group
Wardak dialect
Taniwola dialect
Mangal tribe dialect
Khosti dialect
Zadran dialect
Bangash-Orakzai-Turi-Zazi dialect
Afridi dialect
Khogyani dialect

3. Tareeno Dialect

Literary Pashto 
Literary Pashto is the artificial variety of Pashto which is used at times as literary register of Pashto. It  is said to be based on the North Western dialect, spoken in the central Ghilji region. Literary Pashto's vocabulary, also derives from other dialects.

Criticism 
There is no actual Pashto that can be identified as  "Standard" Pashto, as Colye remarks:

As David MacKenzie notes there is no real need to develop a "Standard" Pashto:

Standardisation also comes at the cost of overlooking the rich number of Pashto dialects.

Literature

Pashto-speakers have long had a tradition of oral literature, including proverbs, stories, and poems. Written Pashto literature saw a rise in development in the 17th century mostly due to poets like Khushal Khan Khattak (1613–1689), who, along with Rahman Baba (1650–1715), is widely regarded as among the greatest Pashto poets. From the time of Ahmad Shah Durrani (1722–1772), Pashto has been the language of the court. The first Pashto teaching text was written during the period of Ahmad Shah Durrani by Pir Mohammad Kakar with the title of Maʿrifat al-Afghānī ("The Knowledge of Afghani [Pashto]"). After that, the first grammar book of Pashto verbs was written in 1805 under the title of Riyāż al-Maḥabbah ("Training in Affection") through the patronage of Nawab Mahabat Khan, son of Hafiz Rahmat Khan, chief of the Barech. Nawabullah Yar Khan, another son of Hafiz Rahmat Khan, in 1808 wrote a book of Pashto words entitled ʿAjāyib al-Lughāt ("Wonders of Languages").

Poetry example
An excerpt from the Kalām of Rahman Baba:

Pronunciation: 

Transliteration: 

Translation: "I Rahman, myself am guilty that I am a lover,
On what does this other universe call me guilty."

Proverbs
See: 

Pashto also has a rich heritage of proverbs (Pashto matalúna, sg. matál). An example of a proverb:

Transliteration: Obә́ pə ḍāng nə beléẓ̌i

Translation: "One cannot divide water by [hitting it with] a pole."

Phrases

Greeting phrases

Colors 
List of colors:

List of colors borrowed from neighbouring languages:

  nārәnjí - orange [from Persian]
  gulābí - pink [from Hindustani, originally Persian]
  nilí - indigo [from Persian, ultimately Sanskrit]]

Times of the day

Months 
Pashtuns use the Vikrami calendar:

Notes

References

Bibliography
 
 Georg Morgenstierne (1926) Report on a Linguistic Mission to Afghanistan. Instituttet for Sammenlignende Kulturforskning, Serie C I-2. Oslo. 
 Daniel G. Hallberg (1992) Pashto, Waneci, Ormuri (Sociolinguistic Survey of Northern Pakistan, 4). National Institute of Pakistani Studies, 176 pp. .
 Herbert Penzl A Grammar of Pashto: A Descriptive Study of the Dialect of Kandahar, Afghanistan, 
 Herbert Penzl A Reader of Pashto,

Further reading
Morgenstierne, Georg. "The Place of Pashto among the Iranic Languages and the Problem of the Constitution of Pashtun Linguistic and Ethnic Unity." Paṣto Quarterly 1.4 (1978): 43-55.

External links

 Pashto Dictionary with Phonetic Keyboard & Auto-Suggestion
 Pashto Phonetic Keyboard
 Pashto Language & Identity Formation in Pakistan
 Indo-Aryan identity of Pashto
 Henry George Raverty. A Dictionary of the Puk'hto, Pus'hto, or Language of the Afghans. Second edition, with considerable additions. London: Williams and Norgate, 1867.
 D. N. MacKenzie, "A Standard Pashto", Khyber.org
 Freeware Online Pashto Dictionaries
 A Pashto Word List
 Origins of Pashto
 Resources for the Study of the Pashto Language

 
Iranian languages
Eastern Iranian languages
Languages of Afghanistan
Languages of Balochistan, Pakistan
Languages of Khyber Pakhtunkhwa
Languages of Pakistan
Subject–object–verb languages
Fusional languages
Articles containing video clips